"Você Partiu Meu Coração" is a song recorded by Brazilian Nego do Borel, featuring Brazilian singers Anitta and Wesley Safadão. It was written by Romeu R3, Jefferson Junior, and Umberto Tavarez, and was produced by Umberto Tavares and Mãozinha.

Music video
The music video was recorded on 3 February 2017 during the pre-Carnival of Rio de Janeiro. It was directed by por Mess Santos and Phill Mendonça and released on 19 February. The video was inspired by the Brazilian novel, Dona Flor and Her Two Husbands, written by Jorge Amado. "Você Partiu Meu Coração" was – at that time – the most watched music video within 24 hours in Brazil, having 2.8 million views.

Track listing

Charts

Weekly charts

Year-end charts

Maluma version

"Corazón" is a song recorded by Colombian singer Maluma featuring Brazilian singer Nego do Borel. It is a remix of Nego do Borel's song "Você Partiu Meu Coração" and was released on 3 November 2017 as the lead single from Maluma's third studio album, F.A.M.E. (2018). It was written by Maluma, Kevin Jiménez, Jeferson Almeida, Umberto Tavarez, Bryan Lezcano and
Aurélio Martins, and produced by Tavarez, Mãozinha and The Rude Boyz. The single has peaked at number 87 on the Billboard Hot 100 and at number five on the Billboard Hot Latin Songs chart.

Background and release
On 21 April 2017, Maluma released the lead single "Felices los 4" from his upcoming third studio album X. However the name of album was changed and its lead single became "Corazón", as it was later confirmed that the latter song was not to be included on the album at the time.

On 30 October 2017, Maluma revealed via social media the name and release date of "Corazón", which was set to be released on 3 November 2017. The post contained a neon heart with a non-lit crack in the center, which on the days leading up to the release of the single would further light up until it eventually showed a completely lit, broken neon heart.

Commercial performance
In the United States, "Corazón" debuted at number 92 on the Billboard Hot 100 on 13 January 2018, marking Maluma's third entry and Borel's first entry and becoming sixth Brazilian artist entry on the chart.

Music video
The music video for "Corazón" premiered on 8 December 2017 on Maluma's Vevo account on YouTube. It was directed by Jessy Terrero and shot in São Paulo, Brazil. Ronaldinho Gaúcho makes a cameo appearance in the video. The music video has over 1.5 billion views on YouTube as of February 2022.

Track listing

Charts

Year-end charts

Certifications

Release history

See also
 List of number-one songs of 2017 (Mexico)
 List of number-one songs of 2018 (Mexico)
 List of airplay number-one hits of the 2010s (Argentina)
 List of Billboard number-one Latin songs of 2018

References

External links

2017 songs
2017 singles
Anitta (singer) songs
Portuguese-language songs
Latin pop songs
Sony Music singles